Panau adusta is a moth in the family Cossidae. It was described by Roepke in 1957. It is found in Vietnam, Malaysia and on Sumatra, Java and Borneo.

References

Natural History Museum Lepidoptera generic names catalog

Zeuzerinae
Moths described in 1957